Jerry Busher is an American drummer and multi-instrumentalist. He is known for his work with Fidelity Jones and Fugazi.

Career
Jerry Busher is a musician, audio engineer and artist from the Washington DC area.

He played drums in Fidelity Jones from spring 1988 to spring 1990, touring the US and Canada. Fidelity Jones released Piltdown Lad E.P in 1989 and Venus On Lovely single in 1990 and are featured on the 20 Years Of Dischord and State Of The Union compilations.

Busher played drums with the Washington, DC rock group Elevator in 1992, which also featured John Hammill (Pussy Galore, Velvet Monkeys) and Malcolm Riviera (Gumball, Velvet Monkeys).

He formed Allscars in 1996 an "experimental" band that played improvised as well as structured music. Allscars released 3 full-length recordings ( early/ambient, Introduction to Humanity and Lunar Magus) toured the US, Canada, Europe and Japan. Busher played drums, trumpet samples/effects and painted the cover art.

In 1997 Busher began playing in The Spinanes with Rebecca Gates playing on the record Arches and Aisles, released on September 23, 1998. The album features guest spots and co-production by John McEntire and vocals by Sam Prekop.

Busher served as roadie for Fugazi in the 1990s, and began providing drums, percussion and trumpet to their live performances. His drums and percussion work is featured on the Fugazi releases The Argument and Furniture.

Busher can also be heard on multiple live recordings on the Fugazi Live Archive.

In 2001 Busher met guitarist John Frusciante when Frusciante attended several west coast Fugazi shows. He asked Busher to play drums for his DC EP, a four-song record tracked at Inner Ear Studios in Washington, DC and produced by Ian MacKaye.

In 2001, Busher formed French Toast with James Canty, another multi-instrumentalist and veteran of the Washington, DC music scene. The two (along with Ben Gilligan, since 2005) switch instruments and roles depending on the needs of each song. French Toast released 2 full-length albums In A Cave and Ingleside Terrace on Dischord Records. French Toast toured the US, Canada, and Europe as a headliner as well as opening for bands such as Sleater Kinney, Modest Mouse, Wilco and The Red Hot Chili Peppers.

In 2008, Busher played dates with Funk Ark, a DC funk band with a horn section as well as singers Federico Aubele and Alfonso Velez.

In October 2013, Busher joined the Washington, DC-based glam/progressive-rock band Deathfix, replacing Devin Ocampo as drummer.

In 2016 Busher released a solo EP Bowl In A China Shop on Bandcamp.

Solo discography 
 Bowl In A China Shop, Bandcamp
 Jerry Busher: Vocals, Guitar, Bass, Drums, Electronics, Ukulele, Trumpet

Credits
 Fidelity Jones - Drums
 State Of The Union Compilation, Dischord Records
 Piltdown Lad, Dischord Records; Venus On Lovely, Dischord Records
 Chris Bald 96 -  Drums
 The Pre-Moon Syndrome Post Summer (Of Noise) Celebration Week!, recorded live at D.C. Space In Washington, D.C. during September 11-16, 1989, Sun Dog Propaganda Label
 Las Mordidas -  Drums, Artwork
 Surrounded b/w K.I.T.A, Compulsiv
 Mukilteo Fairies/Las Mordidas split single, Honey Bear Records
 WGNS Gots No Station Compilation, Echoes Of The Nation’s Capitol Compilation
 Allscars - Drums, Electronics, Trumpet, Artwork, Audio Engineer
 Allscars (self-titled single), 1996, Ace Fu Records
 early/ambient, 1997, Slowdime Records
 Introduction To Humanity, 1999, Slowdime Records
 Troubleman Mix (tape Compilation), 2001, Troubleman Unlimited
 Stretching Jupiter (single), 2001, DotLineCircle (Japanese release)
 Holy Rollers -  Drums
 Vehicle compilation single, 1995, Shute Records
 The Spinanes -  Drums
 Arches And Aisles, 1998, Sub Pop
 All Sold Out (single), 1999, Sub Pop
 Brendan Canty and Jerry Busher - Drums, Guitar, Trumpet
 Mebranaphonics compilation, 2001, Monitor Records
 French Toast - Drums, Vocals, Bass, Guitar, Artwork, Audio engineer
 Bugman EP, 2002, Arrest Records
 Hatred Mace/For Sylvia (single), 2003, Arrest Records
 Radio CPR:Begin Live Transmission (compilation), 2003, Dischord Records
 One Bright sunny Morning (compilation), 2005, Iseler Communication Recordings
 In A Cave, 2005, Dischord Records
 SPEX CD #50 (compilation), 2005, SPEX
 Ingleside Terrace, 2006, Dischord Records
  Blonde Redhead - Trumpet
 Symphony Of Treble/Kasuality (single), 1997, Touch And Go Records
 Fugazi - Drums, Percussion, Trumpet, Photographer (End Hits)
 The Argument, 2001, Dischord Records
 Furniture (single), 2001, Dischord Records
 Fugazi Live Series, miscellaneous live concert recordings, Dischord Records
 Beauty Pill - Trumpet
 The Cigarette Girl From The Future, 2001, DeSoto Records
 Orthrelm - Audio Engineer
 Orthrelm/Touchdown split release, 2002, Troubleman Unlimited
 Ted Leo And The Pharmacists - Audio Engineer
 Bridges, Squares (single), 2002, Tiger Style Records
 Dead Meadow - Audio Engineer
 Shivering King And Others, 2003, Matador Records
 Lida Husik - Drums, Audio Engineer
 Mad Flavor, 1999, Alias
 Nuclear Soul, 2006, Digital single
 Mascott - Drums, Percussion
 Electric poems, 1998, Le Grand Magistery
 Follow The Sound, 2000, Le Grand Magistery
 The Evens - Trumpet
 The Odds, 2012, Dischord Records.
 Alfonso Vélez - Drums, Percussion
 The Weather, 2011, DJ Boy Records
 Alfonso Vélez, 2012, Orbital Records
  John Frusciante - Drums, percussion
 DC EP, 2004, Record Collection
 Joe Lally - Drums
 There To Here, 2006, Dischord Records
 Natalia Clavier - Drums
 Live At The Triple Door, 2009, ESL Music
 Federico Aubele - Drums
 Berlin 13, 2011, ESL
 Sunwolf - Drums, Percussion, Producer, Audio Engineer
 Angel Eyes, 2014, El Rey Records
 Follow The Dreamers, 2017,  El Rey Records
 Struck, Original Cast Recording featuring Alan Cumming - Drums, 2019, Broadway records

References

Living people
Road crew
Year of birth missing (living people)
American drummers
American multi-instrumentalists
Place of birth missing (living people)